Leila Haveia Fleming Clark Staffler is an American politician and educator who served as a member of the Northern Mariana Islands House of Representatives for the 5th district. Staffler is the Acting Secretary of Labor under Governor Arnold Palacios, pending confirmation by the Northern Mariana Islands Senate.

Education 
Staffler earned a Bachelor of Arts degree in liberal arts from Willamette University in 2001 and a Master of Science in educational leadership and administration from Western Governors University.

Career 
From 2001 to 2007, Staffler worked as an art and English teacher at Tinian Jr./Sr. High School. From 2007 to 2010, she was an English teacher at Kagman High School in Saipan. She later worked as the principal of Kagman High School from 2013 to 2021. Staffler was elected to the Northern Mariana Islands House of Representatives in November 2020 and assumed office on January 11, 2021. She was the Democratic nominee for lieutenant governor of the Northern Mariana Islands in the 2022 gubernatorial election. Staffler and her running mate Tina Sablan finished in third place in the election, after which they endorsed the Independent ticket of Arnold Palacios and David Apatang. After Palacios won the runoff election, he selected Staffler as his Secretary of Labor. Staffler is serving in an acting capacity, pending her confirmation by the Northern Mariana Islands Senate.

References 

Living people
Northern Mariana Islands politicians
Willamette University alumni
Western Governors University alumni
Members of the Northern Mariana Islands House of Representatives
Year of birth missing (living people)